GINS is a protein complex essential to the DNA replication process in the cells of eukaryotes. The complex participates in the initiation and elongation stages of replication.

The name GINS is an acronym created from the first letters of the Japanese numbers 5-1-2-3 (go-ichi-ni-san) in a reference to the 4 protein subunits of the complex: Sld5, Psf1, Psf2, and Psf3.

A similar complex has been identified in Archaea.

References

Protein complexes